Solidago pinetorum  is a North American plant species in the family Asteraceae, called Small's goldenrod or pineywoods goldenrod. It is found in the east-central United States: Virginia, West Virginia, and the Carolinas.

Solidago pinetorum is a perennial herb up to 110 cm (44 inches) tall, spreading by means of underground rhizomes. One plant can produce as many as 350 small yellow flower heads in a showy branching array at the top of the plant. The plant grows in open places, often in pine woodlands on hillsides.

References

External links
Lady Bird Johnson Wildflower Center, University of Texas

pinetorum
Plants described in 1903
Flora of the Eastern United States